The 2002 Pilot Pen Tennis was a women's tennis tournament played on outdoor hard courts. It was the 20th edition of the Pilot Pen Tennis and was part of the Tier II Series of the 2002 WTA Tour. It took place at the Cullman-Heyman Tennis Center in New Haven, United States, from August 19 through August 24, 2002. First-seeded Venus Williams won the singles title, her fourth consecutive at the event, and earned $93,000 first-prize money as well as 195 ranking points.

Finals

Singles

 Venus Williams defeated  Lindsay Davenport 7–5, 6–0
 It was Williams' 7th singles title of the year and the 28th of her career.

Doubles

 Daniela Hantuchová /  Arantxa Sánchez Vicario defeated  Tathiana Garbin /  Janette Husárová 6–3, 1–6, 7–5

References

External links
 ITF tournament edition details
 WTA tournament draws

Pilot Pen Tennis
2002
Pilot Pen Tennis
Pilot Pen
Pilot Pen Tennis
2002 Pilot Pen Tennis